Zai shui yi fang may refer to:

Zai shui yi fang, a 1975 Taiwanese novel by Chiung Yao
The Unforgettable Character, a 1975 Taiwanese film based on the novel
One Side of the Water, a 1988 Taiwanese TV series based on the novel

See also
Classic of Poetry, a  600 BC Chinese poetry collection where the phrase first occurs